The GLAAD Vanguard Award is a special GLAAD Media Award presented annually by the Gay & Lesbian Alliance Against Defamation at the GLAAD Media Awards ceremony held in Los Angeles. It is presented to a member of the entertainment community who does not identify as LGBT but who has made a significant difference in promoting equal rights for LGBT people.

List of recipients
 1993 - Roseanne Barr and Tom Arnold
 1994 - Aaron Spelling
 1995 - Steve Tisch
 1996 - Sidney Sheinberg
 1997 - Cristina Saralegui
 1998 - Cher
 1999 - Whoopi Goldberg
 2000 - Elizabeth Taylor
 2002 - Shirley MacLaine
 2003 - Eric McCormack
 2004 - Antonio Banderas
 2005 - Liza Minnelli
 2006 - Charlize Theron
 2007 - Jennifer Aniston
 2008 - Janet Jackson
 2009 - Kathy Griffin
 2010 - Drew Barrymore
 2011 - Kristin Chenoweth
 2012 - Josh Hutcherson
 2014 - Jennifer Lopez
 2015 - Kerry Washington
 2016 - Demi Lovato
 2017 - Patricia Arquette
 2018 - Britney Spears
 2019 - Beyoncé & Jay Z
 2020 - Taylor Swift
 2022 - Kacey Musgraves

References

External links
 Official GLAAD Media Awards website

Vanguard Award